Adrian James Toole (born 12 June 1965) is an Australian former professional rugby league footballer who played in the 1980s and 1990s.

Playing career
A Forbes junior, Toole trialed with the North Sydney Bears in 1985. Later that year, he made his first grade debut under the coaching of former North Sydney and St. George forward Brian Norton in round 24 of the 1985 season against the Manly Sea Eagles at Brookvale Oval, and for 8 seasons from 1988 was a permanent first grade player and North Sydney stalwart.

During Toole's tenure with the Bears, the club's fortunes turned around. They went from being easybeats (not having won a premiership since 1922) to title contenders. They finished one game shy of qualifying for the club's first Grand Final appearance since 1943, losing both the 1991 and 1994 preliminary finals to the Canberra Raiders. Toole however won a Reserve Grade premiership with Norths in 1993. Toole retired at the end of the 1995 season after his side's 20-10 loss to the Newcastle Knights in the first week of the 1995 finals series. He played 130 games for the Bears and scored 8 tries.

Post playing
In 2006, Toole narrowly missed out on selection in North Sydney's Team of the Century. Gary Larson and Billy Wilson were instead chosen as props.

References

1965 births
Living people
Australian rugby league players
North Sydney Bears players
Rugby league props
Rugby league players from Forbes, New South Wales